Joseph Charbonneau, (July 31, 1892 – November 19, 1959) was a Canadian prelate of the Roman Catholic Church, who served as Archbishop of Montreal from 1940 to 1950.

Born in Lefaivre, Alfred and Plantagenet, he was ordained to the priesthood on June 24, 1916.

On June 22, 1939, Charbonneau was appointed Bishop of Hearst by Pope Pius XI. He received his episcopal consecration on the following August 15 from Archbishop Joseph-Guillaume-Laurent Forbes, with Archbishop Emile Yelle, PSS, and Bishop Louis Rhéaume, OMI, serving as co-consecrators. Charbonneau was later named Coadjutor Archbishop of Montreal and Titular Archbishop of Amorium on May 21, 1940. He succeeded the late Georges Gauthier as Archbishop of Montreal on August 31, 1940.

He is best known in Canada for his pro-labour role in the Asbestos Strike. Upon his resignation on February 9, 1950, Charbonneau was made titular Archbishop of Bosphorus and accepted work in British Columbia as a hospital chaplain.

For his interest in interdenominational dialogue, the rights of organised labour, and the well-being of minority groups, Archbishop Charbonneau has been seen as a precursor to the Quiet Revolution.

References

External links
 Catholic Hierarchy profile
 Rumors about his resignation

1892 births
1959 deaths
20th-century Roman Catholic archbishops in Canada
Roman Catholic archbishops of Montreal
Amorium
Roman Catholic bishops of Hearst–Moosonee